Cellofan – med døden til følge is a 1998 Norwegian crime film directed by Eva Isaksen, starring Andrine Sæther and Sverre Anker Ousdal. The young journalist Marianne Hovden (Sæther) is instructed by her father on his deathbed to burn a box of letters hidden in his attic. Defying his wish, she reads the letters, where he is accused of the murder of a young woman 25 years ago. Convinced of her father's innocence, she travels to the small village where the murder took place, to solve the mystery.

External links
 
 
 Cellofan – med døden til følge at the Norwegian Film Institute

1998 films
1998 crime films
Norwegian crime films